Stade Cardinal Malula, formerly known as Stade 24 Novembre and before  Stade Reine Astrid,  is a stadium located in Kinshasa, Democratic Republic of the Congo.  It opened in 1937 and serves as the home of AS Dragons.

It is currently named in honor of Joseph Malula, Archbishop of Kinshasa  from 1964 to his death in 1989. It was before named of the date Mobutu Sese Seko seized power in the country in 1965 and previously named after Astrid of Sweden, Queen consort of the Belgians, when Congo was a Belgian colony.

External links
Stadium information

Buildings and structures in Kinshasa
Sport in Kinshasa
Football venues in the Democratic Republic of the Congo
Sports venues completed in 1937
1937 establishments in the Belgian Congo
Lukunga District